Elections in the British Virgin Islands are conducted to elect members to the House of Assembly (formerly named the Legislative Council).   In the British Virgin Islands elections are not conducted in relation to appointments to either the Executive or Judicial branches of Government, and there are no other publicly elected posts in the British Virgin Islands.  Most elections are conducted as general elections, which under the Constitution are required to be held every four years, or as by-elections when a member of the House of Assembly dies or steps down.  Since the re-introduction of democracy into the British Virgin Islands in 1950 there have been fifteen general elections, and three recorded by-elections.  The last election was held on 25 February 2019.

The British Virgin Islands elects on territorial level to a unicameral legislature. The House of Assembly has a total of 15 members, 13 of whom are members elected by the public to serve a four-year term, plus two ex-officio non-voting members: the Attorney General and the Speaker of the House.  Of the 13 elected members, nine are elected to represent Territorial district seats, and four are elected on a Territory-wide "at-large" basis.

Since 1999 the British Virgin Islands effectively has had a two-party system, which means that there are two dominant political parties.  Prior to 1999 the political arena has been much more varied, with sometimes three or even four political parties seriously contesting elections.  In the period 1990 to 1995 there was really no other serious political parties providing an alternative to the Virgin Islands Party in the Territory.  Historically independent candidates have fared well in British Virgin Islands; in the 1979 general election independent candidates won a greater share of the vote (38.0%) than any political party, and won 4 out of the 9 available seats.  However, 1999 general election marked the first time that no independent candidate was elected, and since that date only one person standing as an independent candidate has been elected (Alvin Christopher in 2003 general election).

Elections are held at least every four years.  The system of elections is Westminster-style.  The parties nominate candidates on a nomination day, then the election is held several weeks later.  Government is formed by the leader best able to command a majority in the House.

Qualifications

Qualifications for standing for election
Qualifications to be elected as a member of the House of Assembly are now regulated by article 65 of the Constitution.  Broadly speaking this requires that the candidate must be a second generation Belonger, and must either be domiciled in the British Virgin Islands or have completed a period of residence.

In order to be elected as a member of the House, a person must either be a Virgin Islander (as defined) over the age of 21, and otherwise qualified to vote in the Territory.  For these purposes a "Virgin Islander" means a Belonger who is either:
 a person who was born in the British Virgin Islands to a mother or father who was a British Overseas Territories Citizen (by birth or descent);
 a person who was born in the British Virgin Islands to a mother or father who was also a Belonger (by birth or descent); or
 a person who was born outside of the British Virgin Islands to a mother or father who was also a Belonger (by birth or descent) provided that one of his or grandparents also belonged to the British Virgin Islands by birth.

A person may also be qualified to stand for election if they were qualified to stand in the 2007 general election under the previous Constitution, regardless of whether or not they have previously stood for election.

However, a person is disqualified from being elected (regardless of where they are born) if they are not domiciled in the British Virgin Islands unless:
 in the case of a person who has never been domiciled in the British Virgin Islands, they have resided in the Territory for at least 5 years immediately before the date of their nomination for election; or
 in the case of a person who was formerly domiciled in the British Virgin Islands, but have lived outside of the Territory for at least 10 years, they have resided in the Territory for at least 3 years immediately before the date of their nomination for election.

Disqualifications from standing for election
A person is disqualified from being elected as a member of the House if:
 they hold any public office;
 they are declared bankrupt in any country;
 they are adjudged to be of unsound mind in any country;
 a sentence of death has been imposed upon them, or if they have served a term of imprisonment of at least 12 months within the previous five years;
 they are disqualified or suspended under the laws of the British Virgin Islands relating to elections offences; or
 they are a party to, or a partner in a firm, or director or manager of company, with any contract with the Government for a public service (unless they have published a notice in the Gazette or other British Virgin Islands newspaper disclosing the nature of the contract and their interest).

Qualifications for voting
Qualifications to be registered as a voter in the British Virgin Islands are now regulated by article 68 of the Constitution.  A person is qualified to vote if they are a Belonger aged 18 or older, and are either resident in the British Virgin Islands or are domiciled in the British Virgin Islands and resident in the United States Virgin Islands.

However a person is disqualified from voting if:
 they are adjudged to be of unsound mind under British Virgin Islands law;
 a sentence of death has been imposed upon them, or if they are serving a term of imprisonment of at least 12 months; or
 they are disqualified or suspended under the laws of the British Virgin Islands relating to elections offences.

Political parties

Political parties in the British Virgin Islands are not generally formed on an ideological basis, and do not normally affiliate themselves with a political school of thought.  Political parties do not identify themselves are being on the political right or the political left.  Similarly parties do not normally identify themselves with mainstream political movement such as green politics.  Although there are no religious parties in the British Virgin Islands, all parties typically identify themselves with Christianity.  Most parties campaign on a concepts with close affinity to nationalism, and core competency in relation to administration of Government.  Because of the high numbers of economic migrants in the British Virgin Islands, much political campaigning has a xenophobic tinge to it, and often focuses on political patronage for BVIslanders.

Politicians often develop great loyalty from members of their constituencies.  Possibly linked to the lack of party ideology, politicians often "cross the floor" to another political party without any discernible effect on their popularity, and a number of leading political figures in the Territory have done this multiple times.

Active parties
There are presently three active political parties in the British Virgin Islands as of April 2022:
 The present ruling party is the Virgin Islands Party, led by Premier Andrew Fahie. 
 The present main opposition party National Democratic Party  (led by Marlon A Penn).
 The newly formed People's Empowerment Party (which has never held power), led by Alvin Christopher.

Defunct parties
There are a number of former political parties in the British Virgin Islands, but only four have ever succeeded in having a candidate elected to the legislature:
 The United Party (originally called the BVI United Party), which won general election victories in 1967, 1975 and 1983.  Defunct since approximately 2005 by-election.
 VI Democratic Party, which won the 1971 general election (together with Willard Wheatley (Ind)).  Contested each general election from 1967 to 1979 except for 1975.  Defunct since 1979.
 People's Own Party.  Only contested the 1967 general election, winning one seat (Isaac Fonseca) in a seven-seat legislature.  Defunct since at least 1971.
 Independent People's Movement.  Put forward two candidates in the 1990 general election; one was elected (Omar Hodge).  No other electoral appearances.  Defunct shortly after formation.

Electoral issues
Elections in the British Virgin Islands are rarely conducted on an ideological basis, or even in relation to specific local political issues.  Instead, voters are generally asked to choose between two primary parties (and a host of independent candidates) and vote on the basis of a combination of:
 party loyalty
 competence to govern
 political patronage

Most election campaigns are usually conducted on the basis of each candidate who is affiliated with a party pointing to their own successes in government, and criticising the performance of the other party.  Each party will typically try to present itself as the party who fights for the "common man", and accuse the other party of financial mismanagement or corruption, as well as alleging that they only act in the best interests of limited pool of well connected wealthy persons.  Independent candidates will typically argue that neither party is competent or trustworthy, and that unaffiliated politicians should be elected.

British Virgin Islands politics have become highly polarised since the mid-1990s.  Since the 1999 general election, no party won consecutive terms in office until the NDP secured victory in the 2015 general election.  Prior to the 1990s independent candidates were a common feature of legislatures in the British Virgin Islands, but more recently politics have become party dominated, and independent candidates and candidates for minority parties are rarely successful.

Latest elections

Past elections

General elections 1950 - 1963
Prior to 1967 elections were held on a non-party basis.  Relatively few records survive in relation to these early elections, and it is possible that they were conducted by straw poll or show of hands rather than by ballot.

In 1950 four legislators were elected to the Legislative Council on a Territory-wide basis.  The inaugural legislative council included four elected members: Isaac Glanville Fonseca, Howard R. Penn MBE, Carlton L.E. deCastro and John Charles Brudenell-Bruce MBE.

In 1953 the number of legislators was increased to six, and elections were conducted on the basis of territorial constituencies (with Road Town electing two legislators).

General elections 1967 to date
In 1967 Ministerial government was introduced into the British Virgin Islands, and candidates organised themselves into political parties.  The results of the party contested general elections were as follows:

By-elections
There have been three recorded by-elections in the British Virgin Islands to date: the first in 1977 following the death of Austin Henley (VIDP - 2nd District), the second in 1995 following the death of Lavity Stoutt (VIP - 1st District), and the third in 2005 following the death of Paul Wattley (NDP - At-large).  In each case except the first the party which had won the seat originally held the seat at the by-election.  A further by-election was expected following the death of the Delores Christopher, but because of the proximity to the 2019 general election it was decided to bring forward the date of the general election instead, and not hold a separate by-election.

Electoral milestones and feats

See also
 Electoral calendar
 Electoral system

Footnotes